"Playing Games" is a song by American singer Summer Walker from their debut studio album, Over It (2019). The song was released as the lead single from the album on August 23, 2019. The extended version features guest vocals from American singer Bryson Tiller. The song samples Destiny's Child's song "Say My Name" (1999).

Critical reception
Alphonse Pierre of Pitchfork said that, in the song, Walker "addresses the lame dudes that continue to take their passion for granted" while not acknowledging "their relationship on Instagram". The Fader named it one of the best songs on Over It, reasoning their choice by stating that the chorus is a "full interpolation of one of Destiny’s Child’s most ubiquitous preachings" despite Walker not "phoning it in" and compared it to an old Nelly song.

Music video
The music video was released on October 8, 2019, and was directed by Christine Yuan. Despite being featured on the extended version of the song, Bryson Tiller does not appear in the clip. The video features shots of Walker sitting and lying on a bed surrounded by bright city lights in the backdrop. During the video, Walker has one man tied up and hanging from the ceiling while another one is seen being confined to a chair. Being fed-up with lies, Walker goes on to ignore a man bringing them flowers and apologizing.

Charts

Weekly charts

Original version

Extended version

Year-end charts

Original version

Certifications

References

2019 singles
2019 songs
Bryson Tiller songs
Songs written by London on da Track
Songs written by LeToya Luckett
Songs written by Kelly Rowland
Songs written by Beyoncé
Songs written by Fred Jerkins III
Songs written by Rodney Jerkins
Songs written by LaShawn Daniels
Songs written by Bryson Tiller